Tony Macaroni is a chain of restaurants in Scotland and Northern Ireland specialising in Italian cuisine. The slogan of the company is vive per mangiare ( "live to eat"). It is the sister company of Nardini's, an ice cream parlour in Largs, Scotland, and Marini's, a Scottish chain of fish and chip shops. The first restaurant in Scotland opened in 2001, in East Kilbride, South Lanarkshire.

Sponsorship
In August 2013 Livingston F.C. announced a three-year kit sponsorship deal with Tony Macaroni. The club's Almondvale Stadium was renamed the Tony Macaroni Arena in 2015.

See also
 List of Italian restaurants

References

External links 
 

Italian restaurants
Restaurant groups in the United Kingdom
Restaurants in Scotland
Companies based in Glasgow